The discography of American DJ Frankie Knuckles consists of two studio albums, a compilation album and twenty-two singles.

His debut studio album Beyond the Mix was released on August 6, 1991, via Virgin Records America. It peaked in the United Kingdom at 59th. His second studio album Welcome to the Real World was released four years later on May 23, 1995, also via Virgin Records. The album is a collaborative project with Adeva. On January 1, 2013, he released the compilation album Greatest – Frankie Knuckles via Trax Records.

Studio albums

Compilation albums

Singles

Remixes
"Change" – Lisa Stansfield
"Someday (I'm Coming Back)" – Lisa Stansfield
"Never, Never Gonna Give You Up" – Lisa Stansfield
"Let the Music (Use You)" – The Nightwriters
"Turn It Out" – Patti LaBelle
"Deep Love" – Dada Nada (Robert Ozn) (Remixed by Knuckles and David Morales)
"Power of Love/Love Power" – Luther Vandross
"Left to My Own Devices" – Pet Shop Boys
"This Time" – Chanté Moore
"Happy" – Towa Tei
"Let No Man Put Asunder" – First Choice
"Ain't Nobody" – Chaka Khan
"Watcha Gonna Do with My Lovin'" – Inner City
"Talking with Myself" – Electribe 101
"The Pressure Part 1" – Sounds of Blackness
"Where Love Lives" – Alison Limerick
"I Want a Dog" – Pet Shop Boys
"Notgonnachange" – Swing Out Sister
"Time Will Tell" – Nu Shooz
"Because of Love" – Janet Jackson
"Love Hangover" – Diana Ross
"Let Me Wake Up in Your Arms" – Lulu
"Bring Me Love" – Andrea Mendez
"Lucky Love" – Ace of Base
"Rock with You" – Michael Jackson
"Scream"  – Michael Jackson
"Thriller"  – Michael Jackson
"You Are Not Alone" – Michael Jackson
"Closer Than Close" – Rosie Gaines
"Un-break My Heart" – Toni Braxton
"I Don't Want To" – Toni Braxton
"Sunshine" – Gabrielle
"Baby I" – Ariana Grande
"I'm Going to Go" – Jago
"Blind" – Hercules & Love Affair
"You've Got the Love" – The Source featuring Candi Staton
"Million Dollar Bill" – Whitney Houston
 "Forever Came Today" – The Jackson 5 (Released On The Remix Suite)
"Wrong" – Depeche Mode
"Don't Wait" – Mapei
"Reflections" – Isabel Rose
"If I Fall" – Myon & Shane 54 with Cole Plante
"Can I Touch You There" – Michael Bolton
"Hot Stuff" (remixed by Knuckles and Eric Krupper) – Donna Summer
"Love Never Felt So Good" (Remixed by Knuckles and D.M.) – Michael Jackson
'Give Me All" (Chaka Khan)

References

Electronic music discographies
House music discographies
Discographies of American artists